Ampyx is an Ordovician-Silurian genus of Asaphid trilobites of the family Raphiophoridae.  Species of Ampyx are characterized by three extended spines on the head-shield, one spine derived from each free cheek, and one spine emanating from the glabellum. Species include Ampyx linleyensis (Lanvirn-Caradoc series).

Collective behaviour

Fossils of the trilobite Ampyx priscus, dating back about 480 million years ago, have been recently described as clustered in lines along the ocean floor. The animals were all mature adults, and were all facing the same direction as though they had formed a conga line or a peloton. It has been suggested they line up in this manner to migrate, much as spiny lobsters migrate in single-file queues. Or perhaps they are getting together for mating. The findings suggest animal collective behaviour has very early evolutionary origins.

Distribution 
Fossils of Ampyx have been found in:

Ordovician
 Acoite, Suri, Ponon-Trehue, Sepulturas and San Juan Formations, Argentina
 Sella Formation, Bolivia
 Australia
 Canada (British Columbia, Newfoundland and Labrador, Northwest Territories, Quebec, Yukon)
 China 
 France 
 Iran 
 Ireland 
 Morocco 
 Norway 
 Russia
 Sweden 
 United Kingdom 
 United States (California, Maine, Nevada, Tennessee, Virginia)

Silurian
 Italy
 United Kingdom

See also 
 List of trilobites

References 

Raphiophoridae
Asaphida genera
Ordovician first appearances
Silurian extinctions
Paleozoic animals of Africa
Trilobites of Africa
Fezouata Formation fossils
Ordovician trilobites of North America
Paleozoic life of British Columbia
Paleozoic life of Newfoundland and Labrador
Paleozoic life of the Northwest Territories
Paleozoic life of Quebec
Paleozoic life of Yukon
Ordovician trilobites of South America
Ordovician Argentina
Fossils of Argentina
Ordovician Bolivia
Fossils of Bolivia
Fossil taxa described in 1827